James Price McLane Jr. (September 13, 1930 – December 13, 2020) was an American competition swimmer, three-time Olympic champion, and a world record-holder.

Biography
Representing the United States at the 1948 Summer Olympics in London, England as a 17-year-old, McLane won a gold medal in the men's 1500-meter freestyle, with a time of 19:18.5, finishing almost 13 seconds ahead of Australian John Marshall (19:31.3). He also earned a silver medal for his second-place finish in the men's 400-meter freestyle (4:43.4), finishing behind fellow American Bill Smith (4:41.0).

He won another gold medal, along with teammates Wally Ris, Wally Wolf, and Bill Smith, as a member of the U.S.'s 4 × 200-meter freestyle relay, which set a new world record of 8:46.0 in the event final.

At the 1948 U.S. Olympic trials for the 4x200-meter freestyle relay, several swimmers who had already qualified for the Olympics in other events slowed down in their heats or swam fast in the prelims and scratched themselves for the final to allow more swimmers to qualify for the U.S. Olympic Team. McLane was one of the two swimmers who swam and scratched themselves from the trials final after having the fastest time in the prelims. Ultimately, coach Robert Kiphuth held a time trial shortly after the actual trials with eleven of the swimmers. This time trial had McLane as first overall with a time of 2:11.0, Bill Smith and Wally Wolf in 2:11.2, and Wally Ris in 2:12.4. The next four-Eugene Rogers in 2:14.2, Edwin Gilbert in 2:15.4, Robert Gibe in 2:15.6, and William Dudley in 2:15.9, were used in the Olympic prelims.

Four years later at the 1952 Summer Olympics in Helsinki, Finland, McLane won another gold medal by swimming the anchor leg for the U.S. team in the 4 × 200-meter freestyle relay, together with relay teammates Wayne Moore, Bill Woolsey, and Ford Konno. The Americans set a new Olympic record of 8:31.1 in the final. In individual competition, he finished fourth in the men's 1,500-meter freestyle (18:51.5), and seventh in the men's 400-meter freestyle (4:40.3).

McLane was born in Pittsburgh, Pennsylvania. At the age of 13, he won the four-mile swim at the national AAU outdoor long-distance championships. As a student at Phillips Academy in Andover, MA, he set national high school records in the 200-yard freestyle, 220-yard freestyle, and 440-yard freestyle. He attended Yale University, where he helped the Yale Bulldogs swimming and diving team win two National Collegiate Athletic Association (NCAA) Championships. He graduated from Yale in 1953. He retired from swimming after winning three gold medals at the 1955 Pan American Games. In 1970, he was inducted into the International Swimming Hall of Fame.

McLane died at his home in Ipswich, Massachusetts, on December 13, 2020, at the age of 90. He had lived in Ipswich for the past 13 years.

See also
 List of members of the International Swimming Hall of Fame
 List of multiple Olympic gold medalists at a single Games
 List of Olympic medalists in swimming (men)
 List of Yale University people
 World record progression 4 × 200 metres freestyle relay

References

External links 

 
Fox, David, "'Boy Wonder' Jim McLane, Olympic Gold Medalist, Dies at 90"

1930 births
2020 deaths
American male freestyle swimmers
World record setters in swimming
Olympic gold medalists for the United States in swimming
Olympic silver medalists for the United States in swimming
Sportspeople from Pittsburgh
Phillips Academy alumni
Swimmers at the 1948 Summer Olympics
Swimmers at the 1952 Summer Olympics
Swimmers at the 1955 Pan American Games
Yale Bulldogs men's swimmers
Medalists at the 1952 Summer Olympics
Medalists at the 1948 Summer Olympics
Pan American Games gold medalists for the United States
Pan American Games medalists in swimming
Medalists at the 1955 Pan American Games